Om Prakash Malhotra was an Indian field hockey player who played as a halfback. He was part of the India national team that won gold at the 1956 Melbourne Olympics. He was a member of the Indian team that toured Afghanistan in 1952 and Malaya and Singapore in 1954. He also played for his State team United Provinces in the Indian national championships.

References

External links

Olympic field hockey players of India
Indian male field hockey players
Living people
Year of birth missing (living people)
Olympic gold medalists for India
Field hockey players at the 1956 Summer Olympics
Medalists at the 1956 Summer Olympics